Lorenzo Ruiz: The Saint... A Filipino is a 1988 Filipino religious biographical film about the life and martyrdom of Saint Lorenzo Ruiz, the first canonized saint of the Philippines. Directed by Maria Saret and written by Serge Custodio Jr., it stars Mat Ranillo III as the titular saint, alongside Charito Solis, Dang Cecilio, Juco Diaz, Rose Ann Gonzales, and Alvin Enriquez.

Critic Lav Diaz gave Lorenzo Ruiz a mixed review, expressing disappointment in the inconsistencies found in the script which kept the film from becoming a classic. It was nominated for 11 FAMAS Awards, including Best Picture, Best Director, and Best Actor, but it did not win in any category. Saret and Custodio won the Film Academy of the Philippines Award for Best Adaptation.

Cast
Mat Ranillo III as Lorenzo Ruiz
Charito Solis
Dang Cecilio
Juco Diaz as Carlos Ruiz
Rose Ann Gonzales
Alvin Enriquez
Rosanno Abelardo
Ed Gaerlan
Joe Fisher
Eyal Samanton
Tony Lao
Ramon Zamora
Philip Gamboa
Paquito Diaz

Critical response
Lav Diaz, writing for the Manila Standard, gave Lorenzo Ruiz a mixed review. He expressed disappointment in the script's inconsistencies such as the jarring language switching among Spanish and Japanese characters and Ranillo's alternating use of "Inay" and "Inang" to refer to Ruiz's mother, as he thought that the filmmakers' storytelling and efforts at historical accuracy were praiseworthy. In addition, Diaz was critical of the crowd scenes ("They do not know what they are doing") and the film's inconsistent lighting. However, Diaz concluded that it is still good enough to watch as a way to know more about Saint Lorenzo Ruiz.

Accolades

References

External links

1988 films
1988 drama films
Catholic Church in Japan
Filipino-language films
Films about Catholicism
Films set in feudal Japan
Films set in the 1600s
Philippine biographical films
Philippine films based on actual events
Philippine historical drama films